Filippenko is a Ukrainian patronymic surname derived from the given name Philip. Notable people with the surname include:

 Aleksandr Filippenko (born 1944), Russian actor
 Alexei Filippenko (born 1958), Ukrainian-American astrophysicist
 Arkady Filippenko (1912–1983), Ukrainian-Soviet composer

See also
 
 Filipenko (disambiguation)

Ukrainian-language surnames
Patronymic surnames
Surnames from given names